Lori A. Mizgorski (née Voegtly; c. 1967–) is an American politician who currently represents the 30th Legislative District in the Pennsylvania House of Representatives. She is a Republican.

Early life and education
Mizgorski is a native of Shaler Township. She graduated from Shaler Area High School in 1985, and studied English at Hood College.

Political career
Lori Mizgorski ran for a seat on the Shaler Township board of commissioners in 2005, missing it in a 562–584 vote. She was elected in 2009, and from January 2011, concurrently served as Shaler Township representative to the Allegheny River Towns Enterprise Zone. Mizgorski began working for Hal English in 2013, when English was elected to the Pennsylvania House of Representatives from District 30. In November of that year, Mizgorski secured a second term as township commissioner. In July 2018, she was nominated by the Republican Party to replace English on the ballot, after English chose not to run for reelection. Mizgorski defeated Democratic Party candidate Betsy Monroe in the general election. To take office as a state legislator, Mizgorski was required to resign her township board position, in which she was replaced by her husband David. In April 2019, Mizgorski was appointed to the board of directors of the Port Authority of Allegheny County, by Mike Turzai, succeeding Robert Vescio. Mizgorski faced Democratic Party candidate Lissa Geiger Shulman in the 2020 general election and was elected to a second term.

Committee assignments 

 Labor & Industry
 Local Government
 Transportation
 Urban Affairs, Subcommittee on Cities, Counties - Second Class - Chair

References

1967 births
Living people
21st-century American women politicians
21st-century American politicians
Women state legislators in Pennsylvania
Republican Party members of the Pennsylvania House of Representatives
People from Allegheny County, Pennsylvania
Hood College alumni
County officials in Pennsylvania